Cape Svyatoy Nos is a headland in the Laptev Sea. Administratively it is part of the Sakha Republic (Yakutia).

Geography
This cape marks the northern end of Ebelyakh Bay. A prominent point, it is one of the landmarks defining the limits of the Laptev Sea according to the International Hydrographic Organization.

References

Svyatoy Nos
Landforms of the Sakha Republic